The Holt Hotel is an historic hotel near Steeple Aston, Oxfordshire, England. It was founded in 1475 as a coaching inn with six rooms and now has 86 rooms. Its restaurant has been awarded a AA Rosette for quality cuisine.

The current building dates from about 1800 and the six gables at the front were added in 1938. It is built of local ironstone and has a Stonesfield Slate roof.

The 17th-century highwayman Claude Duval often stayed at the inn and is said to haunt the hotel. Room 3 in particular is said to have had many sightings of Duval and the hotel has been subject to paranormal investigations.

In 1754 the licensee and his wife at Hopcroft's Holt were murdered. By 1774 the inn was called the King's Arms, but the name was discontinued in the 1850s.

References

External links
The Holt Hotel at Hopcroft's Holt

Coaching inns
Hotels in Oxfordshire
1475 establishments in England